Warriors Rugby Club Helsinki or Warriors RC or WRC is a Finnish rugby club in Helsinki. The club was founded in 2001, when rugby as a sport was played by only a few individuals in Finland. During the first years, the club had players and members from more than 20 different countries.

Warriors was the first club in Finland to establish a ladies rugby team, and has won four ladies XV Championships. Today WRC is one of the most successful rugby clubs in Finland, has won many Finnish championships, and since 2008 always finished the men's XV's season in the top 2. WRC also fields several national team players.

Current teams
Warriors are currently fielding the following teams:

Women 
Women's 15's Championship team 
Women's 1st division team
Women's 7's team
Since 2018 Warriors Women's teams have been collaborating with Linna RC and playing under the team name 'WarriorsLinna', or short 'WaLi'. In the 2022 season, WaLi won at least one game against every competing ladies team in Finnish Rugby, 15s and 7s combined.

Men 
Men's 15's Championship team 
Men's 15's Second division team (WRC2)
Men's 7's team

Academy 
Warriors youth program operates in 5 age groups: U5 (5 and under), U8, U11, U14, U18 and form teams as tournaments and competitions are organized. Warriors Academy has received a grant from the Ministry of Education and Culture (Finland) in 2021 to further develop junior rugby activities.

Touch Rugby 
Warriors organize touch rugby trainings on a weekly basis.

Current standings
Women

 2022: 5th in Finnish XV Championship, Champion of Division I (second team) 
 2021: 5th in Finnish XV Championship 
 2020: 5th in Finnish XV Championship 
 2015: Finnish women's 7's series champions
Men

 2022: 2nd in Finnish XV Championship
 2021: 2nd in Finnish XV Championship
 2020: 2nd in Finnish XV Championship
 2019: Finnish XV Champion

History
Women
2022: Division I Champion, second team
2015: Finnish 7's series champions
2014: Finnish7's series champions, Finnish XV Championship
2013: Finnish 7's series champions, second in Finnish XV Championship
2012: Finnish XV Championship
2011: Finnish XV Championship
2009: Finnish XV Championship

Men

 2022: 2nd in Finnish XV Championship 
 2021: 2nd in Finnish XV Championship
 2020: 2nd in Finnish XV Championship
 2019: Finnish XV Champion 
 2018: Finnish XV Champion
 2017: 2nd in Finnish XV Championship
 2016: 2nd in Finnish XV Championship
 2015: Finnish XV Champion
 2014: 2nd in Finnish XV Championship
 2013: 2nd in Finnish XV Championship
 2012: Finnish XV Champion
 2011: Finnish XV Champion
 2010: Finnish XV Champion
 2009: Finnish XV Champion
 2008: Finnish XV Champion

Homeground 

Warrior play their home games in Myllypuro sports park. Trainings are mainly held in Tali sports park, from November–April indoors in Tali football hall, and from May–October outdoors.

References

External links
Warriors RC
Warriors RC on Instagram
Warriors Rugby MeetUp
Warriors on Finnish Rugby Association's Webpage

Finnish rugby union teams
Sports clubs in Helsinki